Canada has participated in the Eurovision Young Dancers twice since its debut in 1987. They remain the only North American country to ever participate in a Eurovision event, and were also the only Associate Member of the European Broadcasting Union to participate in any Eurovision event until Australia's Eurovision Song Contest debut in 2015.

Participation overview

External links 
 Eurovision Young Dancers

Countries in the Eurovision Young Dancers